Malinga may refer to:
Alex Malinga, Ugandan marathon runner
Lasith Malinga, Sri Lankan cricketer
Purity Nomthandazo Malinga, South African bishop
Thulani Malinga, South African boxer
Vula Malinga, British soprano
Malinga Bandara, Sri Lankan cricketer
Malinga, a town in Louetsi-Bibaka Department of Ngounié Province, Gabon